"Regardless" is a song by English singer Raye and drum and bass band Rudimental, released on 20 November 2020 as the fifth single from Raye's debut mini-album, Euphoric Sad Songs. The song's music video was released on 8 January 2021."Regardless" peaked at number 37 on the UK Singles Chart and charted successfully in Eastern Europe, reaching number one in Bulgaria, and the top five in Romania and Russia.

Background 
"Regardless" was released for digital download and streaming as part of Raye's debut mini-album, Euphoric Sad Songs, on 20 November 2020. In the UK, the track was added to rotation by BBC Radio 1 on 18 December 2020, and BBC Radio 2 on 9 January 2021.

Composition 
"Regardless" is a club track with an electro-enhanced beat. Contact Music described Raye's vocals as "silky smooth" that "have a sultry sheen, [adding] a chic finish" to the track. Written by Raye, Nadia Ali and Markus Moser, it runs for a length of 3 minutes and 17 seconds. The song samples iiO's 2001 single, "Rapture", resulting in Ali and Moser's writing credit.

Music video 
The music video for "Regardless" premiered on 8 January 2021. In the video, Raye and her crew perform choreography to the track in an infinity pool.

Track listing
Digital download and streaming – Hannah Wants remix
 "Regardless" (Hannah Wants remix) – 3:25
 "Regardless" – 3:17

Digital download and streaming – Acoustic
 "Regardless" (acoustic) – 3:44

Credits and personnel 
Credits adapted from Tidal.
 Raye – songwriter, vocals
 Nadia Ali – songwriter
 Markus Moser – songwriter
 Punctual – producer
 Rudimental – producer
 Mark Ralph – additional producer, mixer
 Stuart Hawkes – mastering engineer

Charts

Weekly charts

Year-end charts

Certifications

Release history

References

2020 singles
2020 songs
Raye (singer) songs
Rudimental songs
Polydor Records singles
Song recordings produced by Rudimental
Songs written by Raye (singer)